ONW may refer to:

 Operation Northern Watch, military operation in Iraq following the first Gulf War
 Olathe Northwest High School, Olathe, Kansas
 The ISO 639-3 code for the Old Nubian language
 Oudnederlands Woordenboek, dictionary of the Old Dutch language - see List of dictionaries by number of words